Severe Tropical Storm Chanthu, known in the Philippines as Tropical Storm Gener, was a strong tropical storm that produced deadly flooding in Vietnam and Thailand. Originating from an area of low pressure on June 5, 2004, Chanthu was first declared a tropical depression near southern Leyte Island in the Philippines. Tracking west-northwestward, the depression intensified into a tropical storm over the central Philippines before entering the South China Sea. Once over the warm waters of the sea, the system quickly intensified, attaining its peak 10-minute winds of 110 km/h (70 mph) and 1-minute winds of 140 km/h (85 mph). On June 12, the storm made landfall in Vietnam before quickly weakening over land. By June 13, the system had weakened to a tropical depression and dissipated two days later.

In Vietnam, Chanthu wrought substantial damage and killed 38 people. Damage from the storm was estimated at 125 billion Vietnam dong (US$7.9 million), mostly from agricultural losses. One person was also killed in Thailand.

Meteorological history

Severe Tropical Storm Chanthu originated out of a weak area of low pressure associated with disorganized deep convective activity located about 480 kilometres (300 mi) east-southeast of Yap on June 5. Low wind shear and weak diffluence allowed the system to gradually become organized; however, the following day, the Joint Typhoon Warning Center (JTWC) ceased monitoring the system for potential development. By June 7, convection redeveloped around the low and the JTWC resumed monitoring the low; later in the day, the Japan Meteorological Agency JMA, the Regional Specialized Meteorological Center for the western Pacific basin, classified it as a tropical depression. The same day, the depression entered the Area of Responsibility (AoR) of the Philippine Atmospheric, Geophysical and Astronomical Services Administration and was given the local name Gener.

On June 8, the JTWC issued a Tropical Cyclone Formation Alert for the system as they anticipated it to develop into a tropical storm within 24 hours. At 0000 UTC on June 9, the JTWC designated the depression as Tropical Storm 08W while located about 795 km (495 mi) southeast of Manila, Philippines. Several hours later, the storm made landfall on southern Leyte Island with winds of 55 km/h (35 mph 10-minute winds) according to the JMA and 75 km/h (45 mph 1-minute winds) according to the JTWC. Rapidly tracking towards the west-northwest in response to a subtropical ridge to the north, the storm traversed the Philippine islands by June 10.

Late on June 10, the JMA upgraded the system to a tropical storm, at which time it received the name Chanthu; the name was contributed by Cambodia and is a type of flower. Not long after being named, convection associated with the storm became displaced from the center of circulation, leaving the low pressure center partially exposed. As Chanthu neared Vietnam, it tracked over warm sea surface temperatures in the South China Sea, allowing the storm to quickly intensify. Outflow from the storm improved on June 11 and deep convection developed around the center of circulation. During a 12-hour span late on June 11 through early on June 12, the central barometric pressure of Chanthu dropped 15 hPa (mbar), falling to 975 hPa (mbar).

The maximum sustained winds also rose at this time; the JMA assessed the storm to have peaked with winds of 110 km/h (70 mph 10-minute winds) as a severe tropical storm; however, the JTWC assessed Chanthu to have peaked as a Category 1 typhoon on the Saffir–Simpson hurricane scale with winds of 140 km/h (85 mph 1-minute winds). Chanthu made landfall around 1200 UTC on June 12 near Qui Nhơn, Vietnam, at this intensity. Due to the interaction with land, the storm rapidly weakened, with the JMA classifying it as a tropical depression early on June 13. The remnants of the storm persisted over Cambodia until June 15 at which time it dissipated.

Impact and aftermath
As a tropical storm, Chanthu passed through the Philippines, producing moderate rainfall across several islands. The highest total was recorded at Roxas where  of rain fell. At least 180 homes were completely destroyed and numerous others were damaged. Tens of thousands of hectares of agricultural land was inundated by the storm. Damage from the storm were estimated at 125 billion VND (US$7.9 million). In Thailand, the remnants of Chanthu produced widespread rainfall between June 13 and 16. Storm totals are not known but likely surpassed . Throughout the country, only one person perished as a result of the storm.

Following the storm, the Government of Vietnam allocated 36 billion Vietnamese đồng (US$2 million) in recovery funds. Twenty of the fatalities were from one ship which went missing during the storm, on June 24, search attempts were called off. The families of the fishermen were each given 10 million VND (US$560) in cash and gifts by National Assembly Deputy Chairman Truong Quang Duoc.

See also

Typhoon Chan-hom (2009)
Tropical Storm Sarah (1983)

References

External links

JMA General Information of Severe Tropical Storm Chanthu (0405) from Digital Typhoon
JMA Best Track Data of Severe Tropical Storm Chanthu (0405) 
JMA Best Track Data (Graphics) of Severe Tropical Storm Chanthu (0405)
JMA Best Track Data (Text)
JTWC Best Track Data of Typhoon 08W (Chanthu)
08W.CHANTHU from the U.S. Naval Research Laboratory

2004 Pacific typhoon season
2004 in Vietnam
Typhoons in Vietnam
Western Pacific severe tropical storms
G
G
Tropical cyclones in 2004